Injunctive may refer to:

Injunction, a legal concept
Injunctive mood, a linguistic concept